Allofustis seminis  is a Gram-positive, facultatively anaerobic, rod-shaped and non-spore-forming bacterium from the genus of Allofustis which has been isolated from pig semen in Canada.

References

External links
Type strain of Allofustis seminis at BacDive -  the Bacterial Diversity Metadatabase	

Lactobacillales
Bacteria described in 2003